Horace Mann Public School No. 13 is a historic school building located at Indianapolis, Indiana. It was designed by architect Edwin May (1823–1880) and built in 1873. It is a two-story, square plan, Italianate style red brick building. It has an ashlar limestone foundation and a low hipped roof with a central gabled dormer. A boiler house was added to the property in 1918.

It was listed on the National Register of Historic Places in 1986. It is located in the Holy Rosary-Danish Church Historic District.

References

Individually listed contributing properties to historic districts on the National Register in Indiana
School buildings on the National Register of Historic Places in Indiana
Italianate architecture in Indiana
School buildings completed in 1873
Schools in Indianapolis
National Register of Historic Places in Indianapolis